Bromato de Armonio was a Latin American comedy show made by the group Les Luthiers.

References

External links
http://www.lesluthiers.org
https://web.archive.org/web/20051025032057/http://www.leslu.net/
http://www.lesluthiers.com
http://www.mastropiero.net

Les Luthiers